Castelfidardo was the name of at least two ships of the Italian Navy and may refer to:

 , a  launched in 1863 and stricken in 1910
 , a  launched in 1922, seized by Germany in 1943 being renamed TA16 and sunk in 1944

Italian Navy ship names